Ulmus villosa, the cherry-bark elm or Marn elm,  is one of the more distinctive Asiatic elms, and a species capable of remarkable longevity. It is endemic to the valleys of the Kashmir at altitudes of  but has become increasingly rare owing to its popularity as cattle fodder. Mature trees are now largely restricted to temples and shrines where they are treated as sacred. Some of these trees are believed to be over 800 years old.

Description
The wind-pollinated apetalous flowers appear in spring, and are particularly densely clustered, the white hairs covering the perianth and ovary contrasting with the purplish anthers.

Ecology
U. villosa has a low susceptibility to Dutch elm disease and the elm leaf beetle (Xanthogaleruca luteola), but a moderate susceptibility to elm yellows.

Cultivation
Two trees planted as part of the UK Forestry Commission's elm trials at the Westonbirt Arboretum in the 1970s also died, although the cause of death has not been recorded. The tree was propagated and marketed by the Hillier & Sons nursery, Winchester, Hampshire from 1971 to 1977, with sales totalling 38. 

Plantings elsewhere in Europe are few and far between. A line of more than 20 trees survives at Wageningen in the Netherlands, collected by Heybroek in the Himalayas in 1960. Several trees also survive in the Gijsbrecht-Amstelpark area of Amsterdam and in the port.

Culture

Notable trees 
In the UK, the Tree Register (TROBI) champions are at Bute Park, Cardiff,  ×  diameter at breast height (dbh) in 2005, and two at Brighton, both  ×  dbh in 2009. The specimen planted in 1989 at the Sir Harold Hillier Gardens at an exposed location on clay has grown more in width than height to form an amorphous (albeit healthy) mound of vegetation; in 2005 it was  ×  dbh.

Accessions

North America 
Bartlett Tree Experts, US. . Acc. no. 8384.

Europe 
Brighton & Hove City Council, UK. NCCPG Elm Collection. TROBI champion: Hodshrove Place, 15 m × 65 cm dbh in 2009. 
Grange Farm Arboretum, Lincolnshire. UK. Acc. no. 707.
Royal Botanic Gardens, Kew, UK. Acc. no. 1935-69805. 
Royal Botanic Gardens Wakehurst Place, UK. Acc. nos. 1935-69807, 1935-69809.
Sir Harold Hillier Gardens, Romsey, Hampshire, UK. Acc. no. 1989.2869, wild-collected from Sundarnagar Forest, Himachal Pradesh, India.
Wijdemeren City Council Elm Arboretum, park De Vijnen, Nederhorst den Berg, one tree planted 2018.

Nurseries

Europe 
Pan-Global Plants , Frampton-on-Severn, Gloucestershire, UK.

References

External links
 Vegetative propagation of Ulmus villosa, ingentaconnect.com
 Silvics of Ulmus villosa, cabdirect.org

villosa
Flora of the Indian subcontinent
Ulmus articles with images
Elm species and varieties